2 Nights Live! is a live compilation album of a two-night concert released by Barry Manilow in 2004.  It was recorded on August 3–4, 2002 at PNC Bank Arts Center in Holmdel, NJ; during the last two dates of the Barry Manilow Live 2002! tour.

Track listing

Night 1

Night 2

References
 AllMusic
 [ Billboard]
 Manilow.com

2004 live albums
Barry Manilow live albums
Arista Records live albums